Craig Hentrich (born May 18, 1971) is a former American football punter in the National Football League (NFL) for 17 seasons.  He played college football for Notre Dame. He was drafted by the New York Jets in the eighth round of the 1993 NFL Draft, and has also played for the Green Bay Packers and Tennessee Oilers / Titans. With the Packers, he won Super Bowl XXXI against the New England Patriots.

Early years
Hentrich graduated from Marquette Catholic High School in Alton, Illinois.

College career
Hentrich lettered four years at the University of Notre Dame, serving as both the placekicker and punter. He finished his career with a school-record 44.1-yard punting average and had 39 career field goals (on 56 attempts) to rank second behind John Carney’s 51. Also, he finished his career ranked second on the school's all-time scoring list with 294 points, the most ever by a Fighting Irish kicker, and made a record 98.3 percent (177/180) of his PAT attempts.

Professional career
Hentrich was drafted in the 1993 NFL Draft by the New York Jets, but was then signed to the Green Bay Packers. Hentrich spent four seasons with the Packers, playing in every Green Bay game from 1994 through 1997. He also handled kickoffs regularly for the Packers during the 1996 season, helping the Packers to a world championship in Super Bowl XXXI. Hentrich signed with the Tennessee Oilers following the 1997 season. In 1999, the Titans made it to Super Bowl XXXIV in which Hentrich featured, however they lost to the Kurt Warner-led St. Louis Rams, denying him a second Super Bowl ring.

Hentrich became a free agent after the 2008 season and was thinking of retiring. On March 6, 2009, he decided to return to football and the Titans. He signed a one-year deal for the veteran minimum, which under the labor agreement costs teams considerably less in cap dollars.

Hentrich was placed on injured reserve in 2009, ending his season.

He retired following the 2009 season after playing in 241 games and 16 seasons, falling just short of 50,000 career punting yards.
He was the last remaining Titan player who was also a member of the 1999 team that appeared in the Super Bowl.

References

External links
Tennessee Titans biography
Hentrich Signs One Year Deal

1971 births
Living people
People from Alton, Illinois
Players of American football from Illinois
American football punters
American Conference Pro Bowl players
Notre Dame Fighting Irish football players
New York Jets players
Green Bay Packers players
Tennessee Oilers players
Tennessee Titans players